Salem South or 'Salem (South)' is a state assembly constituency in the Indian state of Tamil Nadu that was formed after the constituency delimitations of 2007. Its State Assembly Constituency number is 90. The previous constituencies - Salem I and Salem II - were redrawn as Salem North, Salem South and Salem West. It is one of the 234 State Legislative Assembly Constituencies in Tamil Nadu.

Salem South comprises Salem Municipal Corporation Wards No. 37 to 60. It is a part of the wider Salem constituency for national elections to the Parliament of India.

Demographics

Elections

Election Results

2021

2016

2011

References 

Assembly constituencies of Tamil Nadu
Salem, Tamil Nadu
Government of Salem, Tamil Nadu